The Poland national kabaddi team represents the country of Poland in international kabaddi competitions. Most recently, Poland won the European Championships 2019 in Glasgow defeating Holland in the finals 48-27 under the captaincy of Michal Spiczko.

Team

References 

Kabaddi
National kabaddi teams
National sports teams of Poland